John Thomas Grant (December 13, 1813 – January 18, 1887) was an American railroad executive.

He was born and raised on a farm near Athens, Georgia and graduated from the University of Georgia in 1833 with a degree in Forestry.

With his brother James and the unrelated Lemuel Grant he founded an engineering firm called Fannin, Grant and Company which constructed railroads in Georgia, Alabama, Tennessee, Mississippi, Louisiana and Texas, during which time he amassed a large fortune and enormous tracts of land.

The American Civil War largely destroyed his prospects.
Although, at the time of his death some 20 years later, he still possessed 60,000 acres (240 km2) in Texas.

He died in Atlanta on January 18, 1887, and was interred in the Grant mausoleum in Oakland Cemetery.

Family
He married Martha Cobb (Jackson) Grant.

References

1813 births
1887 deaths
University of Georgia alumni
19th-century American railroad executives
People from Athens, Georgia
Burials at Oakland Cemetery (Atlanta)